The 2019–20 Hamburger SV season was the 101st season in the football club's history and their second season in the 2. Bundesliga. In addition to the domestic league, Hamburger SV also participated in this season's edition of the domestic cup, the DFB-Pokal. This was the 67th season for Hamburg in the Volksparkstadion, located in Hamburg, Germany. The season covers a period from 1 July 2019 to 30 June 2020.

Background 

The 2018–19 season was Hamburger SV's first season in the second-tier of German football after spending 56 years in the top tier of football in Germany. During the 2018–19 season, Hamburg spent most of the first half of the season atop the 2. Bundesliga table, before a dip in form caused the team to finish fourth in the league table, missing out at a chance of promotion. Pierre-Michel Lasogga lead Hamburg in goals during the campaign scoring 19 goals across all competitions.

Players

Transfers

Transfers in

Loans in

Transfers out

Loans out

Non-competitive

Pre-season exhibitions

Midseason exhibitions

Post-season exhibitions

Competitive

2. Bundesliga

Table

Results by round

Results

DFB-Pokal

Statistics

Appearances and goals

Notes

References

External links 
 Hamburger SV (English)

Hamburger SV seasons
Hamburger SV